The Horoirangi Marine Reserve, sometimes referred to as the Glenduan Marine Reserve, is situated to the north east of Nelson in New Zealand. It stretches along the coast from the northern end of Boulder Bank to just south of Cable Bay.

See also
Marine reserves of New Zealand

References

External links
Horoirangi Marine Reserve at the Department of Conservation
New Zealand Government – announcement on the establishment of the park.

Marine reserves of New Zealand
Underwater diving sites in New Zealand
Protected areas established in 2005
Protected areas of the Nelson Region
2005 establishments in New Zealand